The 2019–20 Basketball Cup of Serbia is the 14th season of the Serbian 2nd-tier men's cup tournament.

On 24 December 2019, the finalist Radnički Beograd qualified for the 2020 Radivoj Korać Cup. On the next day, Sloboda qualified for the Cup also.

Bracket
Source: KUP KSS DRUGI STEPEN

Quarterfinals

Pirot v Novi Pazar

Radnički Beograd v Napredak JKP

Joker v Sloboda

Dunav v OKK Beograd

Semifinals

Radnički Beograd v Novi Pazar

Dunav v Sloboda

Final

See also 
 2019–20 Radivoj Korać Cup
 2019–20 Basketball League of Serbia

References

External links 
 Basketball Competitions of Serbia

Basketball Cup of Serbia
Cup